Mount Belinda is a stratovolcano on Montagu Island, in the South Sandwich Islands of the Scotia Sea. A part of the British Overseas Territory, South Georgia and the South Sandwich Islands, Mount Belinda is also the highest peak in the South Sandwich Islands, at 1,370 m (4,490 ft).

Belinda was inactive until late 2001, when it erupted. The eruption produced large quantities of basaltic lava, melting the thick cover of ice that had accumulated while the volcano lay dormant, and "producing a marvelous 'natural laboratory'; for studying lava-ice interactions relevant to the biology of extreme environments as well as to processes believed to be important on Mars."

The activity throughout 2005 marked the highest levels yet. The increase in activity in the fall of 2005 produced an active -long lava flow, extending from the summit cone of Mount Belinda to the sea. The flow spread northeast from the volcanic vent, and then became diverted due north by an arête. By late 2007, eruptive activity had ceased, and in 2010 the only activity was from scattered fumaroles and cooling lava.

References

External links

 
News@Nature story on the 2005 eruption (subscription required)

Subduction volcanoes
Active volcanoes
Mountains and hills of British Overseas Territories
Volcanoes of South Georgia and the South Sandwich Islands